John Bond (24 July 1753 – 12 May 1824) was a British politician.

He was the eldest son of John Bond, was educated at Winchester College and Magdalene College, Cambridge (1771) and studied law at the Inner Temple (1773), being called to the bar in 1779. He succeeded his father, including to Creech Grange, Dorset on 30 May 1784.

He was the Member of Parliament (MP) for Corfe Castle from  9 September 1780 to 25 February 1801. He resigned from Parliament by accepting the post of Steward of the Chiltern Hundreds. He was appointed High Sheriff of Cardiganshire for 1804–05.

He married Elizabeth, the daughter and heiress of John Lloyd of Cefn-y-Coed, Cardiganshire; they had 2 sons and 2 daughters.

References

 

1753 births
1824 deaths
People educated at Winchester College
Alumni of Magdalene College, Cambridge
Members of the Inner Temple
Members of the Parliament of Great Britain for English constituencies
British MPs 1780–1784
British MPs 1784–1790
British MPs 1790–1796
British MPs 1796–1800
Members of the Parliament of the United Kingdom for English constituencies
UK MPs 1801–1802
High Sheriffs of Cardiganshire